The following outline is provided as an overview of and topical guide to the Turks and Caicos Islands:

The Turks and Caicos Islands (TCI) are a British Overseas Territory comprising two groups of tropical islands north of the Caribbean Sea in the North Atlantic Ocean.

General reference 

 Pronunciation:
 Common English country name: The Turks and Caicos Islands
 Official English country name: Turks and Caicos Islands
 Common endonym(s):  
 Official endonym(s):  
 Adjectival(s): None
 Demonym(s):
 Etymology: Name of the Turks and Caicos Islands
 ISO country codes: TC, TCA, 796
 ISO region codes: See ISO 3166-2:TC
 Internet country code top-level domain: .tc

Geography of the Turks and Caicos Islands 

Geography of the Turks and Caicos Islands
 The Turks and Caicos Islands are: A British Overseas Territory
 Location:
 Northern Hemisphere and Western Hemisphere
 North America (though not on the mainland)
 Atlantic Ocean
 North Atlantic Ocean
 Caribbean (West Indies)
 Time zone:  Eastern Standard Time (UTC-05), Eastern Daylight Time (UTC-04)
 Land boundaries:  none
 High:  Blue Hills on the island of Providenciales 
 Low:  North Atlantic Ocean 0 m
 Coastline:  North Atlantic Ocean 389 km
 Population of the Turks and Caicos Islands: 

 Area of the Turks and Caicos Islands: 
 Atlas of the Turks and Caicos Islands

Environment of the Turks and Caicos Islands 

 Climate of the Turks and Caicos Islands
 Renewable energy in the Turks and Caicos Islands
 Geology of the Turks and Caicos Islands
 Protected areas of the Turks and Caicos Islands
 Biosphere reserves in the Turks and Caicos Islands
 National parks of the Turks and Caicos Islands
 Wildlife of the Turks and Caicos Islands
 Fauna of the Turks and Caicos Islands
 Birds of the Turks and Caicos Islands
 Mammals of the Turks and Caicos Islands

Natural geographical features of the Turks and Caicos Islands 
 Islands of the Turks and Caicos Islands
 Lakes of the Turks and Caicos Islands
 Mountains of the Turks and Caicos Islands
 Volcanoes in the Turks and Caicos Islands
 Rivers of the Turks and Caicos Islands
 Waterfalls of the Turks and Caicos Islands
 Valleys of the Turks and Caicos Islands
 World Heritage Sites in the Turks and Caicos Islands: None

Regions of the Turks and Caicos Islands 
Regions of the Turks and Caicos Islands

Ecoregions of the Turks and Caicos Islands 
List of ecoregions in the Turks and Caicos Islands

Administrative divisions of the Turks and Caicos Islands 
Administrative divisions of the Turks and Caicos Islands
 Districts of the Turks and Caicos Islands

Districts of the Turks and Caicos Islands 
Districts of the Turks and Caicos Islands
Providenciales and West Caicos
North Caicos
Middle Caicos
South Caicos and East Caicos
Grand Turk
Salt Cay, Turks Islands
Turks and Caicos Islands

Demography of the Turks and Caicos Islands 
Demographics of the Turks and Caicos Islands

Government and politics of the Turks and Caicos Islands 
Politics of the Turks and Caicos Islands
 Form of government: parliamentary representative democratic dependency
 Capital of the Turks and Caicos Islands: Grand Turk (Cockburn Town)
 Elections in the Turks and Caicos Islands

 Political parties in the Turks and Caicos Islands
 2009 Corruption scandal

Branches of the government of the Turks and Caicos Islands 
Government of the Turks and Caicos Islands

Executive branch of the government of the Turks and Caicos Islands 
 Head of state: Monarch of the United Kingdom, King Charles III
 Monarch's representative: Governor of the Turks and Caicos Islands, Nigel Dakin
 Head of government: Premier of the Turks and Caicos Islands, Washington Misick
 Cabinet of the Turks and Caicos Islands

Legislative branch of the government of the Turks and Caicos Islands 
 Turks and Caicos Islands House of Assembly (unicameral)
Suspended, powers delegated to Governor

Judicial branch of the government of the Turks and Caicos Islands 
Court system of the Turks and Caicos Islands
 Supreme Court of the Turks and Caicos Islands

Foreign relations of the Turks and Caicos Islands 

 Diplomatic missions in the Turks and Caicos Islands
 Diplomatic missions of the Turks and Caicos Islands

International organization membership 
The government of the Turks and Caicos Islands is a member of:

Caribbean Community and Common Market (Caricom) (associate)
Caribbean Development Bank (CDB)
International Criminal Police Organization (Interpol) (subbureau)
Universal Postal Union (UPU)

Law and order in the Turks and Caicos Islands 
Law of the Turks and Caicos Islands
 Constitution of the Turks and Caicos Islands
 Crime in the Turks and Caicos Islands
 Human rights in the Turks and Caicos Islands
 LGBT rights in the Turks and Caicos Islands
 Freedom of religion in the Turks and Caicos Islands
 Law enforcement in the Turks and Caicos Islands

Military of the Turks and Caicos Islands 
Military of the Turks and Caicos Islands
 Command
 Commander-in-chief:  King Charles III
 Ministry of Defence of the Turks and Caicos Islands
 Forces
 Army of the Turks and Caicos Islands
 Navy of the Turks and Caicos Islands
 Air Force of the Turks and Caicos Islands
 Special forces of the Turks and Caicos Islands
 Military history of the Turks and Caicos Islands
 Military ranks of the Turks and Caicos Islands

Local government in the Turks and Caicos Islands 
Local government in the Turks and Caicos Islands

History of the Turks and Caicos Islands 
History of the Turks and Caicos Islands
 Timeline of the history of the Turks and Caicos Islands
 Current events of the Turks and Caicos Islands
 Military history of the Turks and Caicos Islands

Culture of the Turks and Caicos Islands 
Culture of the Turks and Caicos Islands
 Architecture of the Turks and Caicos Islands
 Cuisine of the Turks and Caicos Islands
 Festivals in the Turks and Caicos Islands
 Languages of the Turks and Caicos Islands
 Media in the Turks and Caicos Islands
 National symbols of the Turks and Caicos Islands
 Coat of arms of the Turks and Caicos Islands
 Flag of the Turks and Caicos Islands
 National anthem of the Turks and Caicos Islands
 People of the Turks and Caicos Islands
 Public holidays in the Turks and Caicos Islands
 Records of the Turks and Caicos Islands
 Religion in the Turks and Caicos Islands
 Christianity in the Turks and Caicos Islands
 Hinduism in the Turks and Caicos Islands
 Islam in the Turks and Caicos Islands
 Judaism in the Turks and Caicos Islands
 Sikhism in the Turks and Caicos Islands
 World Heritage Sites in the Turks and Caicos Islands: None

Art in the Turks and Caicos Islands 
 Art in the Turks and Caicos Islands
 Cinema of the Turks and Caicos Islands
 Literature of the Turks and Caicos Islands
 Music of the Turks and Caicos Islands
 Television in the Turks and Caicos Islands
 Theatre in the Turks and Caicos Islands

Sports in the Turks and Caicos Islands 
Sports in the Turks and Caicos Islands
 Football in the Turks and Caicos Islands

Economy and infrastructure of the Turks and Caicos Islands 
Economy of the Turks and Caicos Islands
 Economic rank, by nominal GDP (2007): 170th (one hundred and seventieth)
 Agriculture in the Turks and Caicos Islands
 Banking in the Turks and Caicos Islands
 National Bank of the Turks and Caicos Islands
 Communications in the Turks and Caicos Islands
 Internet in the Turks and Caicos Islands
 Companies of the Turks and Caicos Islands
Currency of the Turks and Caicos Islands: Dollar
ISO 4217: USD
 Energy in the Turks and Caicos Islands
 Energy policy of the Turks and Caicos Islands
 Oil industry in the Turks and Caicos Islands
 Mining in the Turks and Caicos Islands
 Tourism in the Turks and Caicos Islands
 Transport in the Turks and Caicos Islands
 the Turks and Caicos Islands Stock Exchange

Education in the Turks and Caicos Islands 
Education in the Turks and Caicos Islands

Infrastructure of the Turks and Caicos Islands 
 Health care in the Turks and Caicos Islands
 Transportation in the Turks and Caicos Islands
 Airports in the Turks and Caicos Islands
 Rail transport in the Turks and Caicos Islands
 Roads in the Turks and Caicos Islands
 Water supply and sanitation in the Turks and Caicos Islands

See also 

Turks and Caicos Islands
Index of Turks and Caicos Islands–related articles
List of international rankings
Outline of geography
Outline of North America
Outline of the United Kingdom

References

External links 

 Turks and Caicos Weekly News
 
 
 Foreign Affairs and International Trade Canada - Turks and Caicos profile
 Turks and Caicos - CIA World Factbook
 Turks and Caicos Free Press
 Turks & Caicos Tourist Board
 VisitProvidenciales - Providenciales, Turks and Caicos Tourist Information

History 
 History of the Turks And Caicos Islands
 Turks and Caicos History
 Turks and Caicos Islands Timeline of Significant Historical Events
 WorldStatesmen- Turks and Caicos Islands

Relationship with Canada 
 CBC News Backgrounder - Canada and the Turks and Caicos

Turks and Caicos Islands
Outline